3-Methylmethamphetamine (3-MMA) or Metaphedrine is an amphetamine derivative which has been sold as a designer drug, first being reported in Sweden in 2021.

See also 
 3-Chloromethamphetamine
 3-Methoxymethamphetamine
 3-Methylamphetamine
 3-Methylmethcathinone
 4-Methylmethamphetamine
 Fenfluramine
 3,4-Dimethylamphetamine

References 

Substituted amphetamines
Serotonin-norepinephrine-dopamine releasing agents